Vibygård is a manor house located in the northeastern outskirts of Viby, Roskilde Municipality, some 30 km west of Copenhagen, Denmark. The estate covers 833 hectares of land and comprises the farms Slåenkær, Ørstedgård, Arnakke og Drags-Møllegård

History
Vibygård's history dates back to at least the first half of the 14th century when it was owned by Morten Truelsen Sparre. The estate was owned by members of the Sparre family for the next three hundred years until it was acquired by Sivert Beck in 1620. In 1650 it was acquired by Ove Gjedde who had recently resigned from the post as Admiral of the Realm after falling ill and instead had been granted the fiefdom of Helsingborg Castle in 1648.

In 1682, it became possible efor members of the bourgeoisie to own manors which had belonged to the nobility. That same year Vibygård was purchased by Professor Christian Nold, who had recently resigned from the post as rector of the University of Copenhagen after falling out of favour with Peder Griffenfeld. In 1682, he was reinstituted as rector and married Marie Elligers, the wealthy widow of court jeweller Paul Kurtz. Nold died the following year and their son Christian Nold inherited the estate after his mother died in 1695.

King Frederick IV acquired the estate in 1709. In 1719, he ceded it to Peder Benzon in exchange for Tryggevælde and Alslevgaard. Benzon carried out comprehensive alterations, transforming the house into a two-winged complex, partly with timber framing. In 1852, the estate was purchased by Josias Daniel Hansen Schmidt, a silk and textile merchant. In 1857, he replaced the old main building with the current one in Italian style.

Owners
 (14th century) Slægten Sparre
 (1397-1429) Peder Mortensen Sparre
 (1429-1471) Jens Thorbernsen Sparre
 (1471-1472) Jep Jensen Sparre
 (1490-1511) Thorbern Jepsen Sparre
(1511-1557) Jep Thorbernsen Sparre
 (1577-????) Emmike Jepsen Sparre
 (????-1613) Emmike Emmikesen Sparre
 (1613-1620) Claus Emmikesen Sparre
 (1620-1623) Sivert Beck
 (1623-1648) Steen Sivertsen Beck
 (1648-1650) Ide Lindenov, née Beck
 (1650-1655) Ove Gjedde
 (1655-1666) Otte Krag
 (1666-1667) Sofie Amalie Krag, née 1) Ulfeldt, 2) Rantzau
 (1667-1670) Christoffer Ulfeldt
 (1670-16??)    Sofie Amalie Krag, née 1) Ulfeldt, 2) Rantzau
 (16??-1681) Otto Rantzau
 (1681-1683) Christian Nold
 (1683-1695) Marie Elliger, née 1) Kurtz, 2) Nold
 (1695-1704) Christian Nold
 (1704-1707) Ditlev Reusch
 (1707-1709) Hans Bøtke
 (1709) Anna Maria von Ehrenschild, née Bøtke
 (1709-1719) The Crown
 (1719-1735) Peder Benzon
 (1735-1737) Boet efter Peder Benzon
 (1737-1742) Thomas Johan de Neergaard
 (1742-17??)    Barbara Holgersdatter Olivarius, née 1) de Neergaard, 2) von Westen
 (17??-1757)  J. C. von Westen
 (1757-1758) Adam Christoffer Holsten
 (1758-1775) Peter Mikkelsen Qvistgaard
 (1775-1805) Jørgen Pedersen Qvistgaard
 (1805-1827) Peder Qvistgaard
 (1827-1846) Claus Henrik Munk Sandholt
 (1846-1852) Jacob Jacobsen
 (1852-1872) Josias Daniel Hansen Schmidt
 (1872-1883) Josias Daniel Christian Schmidt
 (1883-1915) Ernst Voss
 (1915-1929) Marie Voss
 (1929-1931) Vilhelm Pedersen
 (1931-1970) J. B. Berthelsen
 (2006-      ) Iver Hecht
 (2006-      ) Aase Glad

Further reading
 Hansen, J.J: Større danske Landbrug. 1930- 937.
 Qvistgaard, Erh.: Stamtavle over Slægten Qvistgaard fra Veirum. 1923. 
 Roussell, Aage (editor): Danske Slotte og Herregårde. Copenhagen 1963-1968.
 Trap, J.P.: Danmark. Copenhagen 1953-1972. At this point, the house was a two storey building with a tower.

References

External links
 Frydenholm
 Spurce

Houses in Roskilde Municipality
Houses completed in 1857
1857 establishments in Denmark
Buildings and structures associated with the Benzon  family